Valdez Quirino Lemos (born 10 February 1943) is a Brazilian former footballer who competed in the 1964 Summer Olympics.

References

1943 births
Living people
Association football defenders
Brazilian footballers
Olympic footballers of Brazil
Footballers at the 1964 Summer Olympics
Fluminense FC players